Ario Soerjo (1898–1948) is now regarded as a National Hero of Indonesia. Soerjo and two policemen were captured by pro-communist (PKI) troop at Walikukun, Widodaren, Ngawi on 9 November 1948, and their dead bodies were found afterwards.

References

National Heroes of Indonesia
People murdered in Indonesia
1898 births
1948 deaths